Daphne Katherine Reid  (4 November 1930 – 27 March 1993) was an English-born Canadian stage, film, and television actress. She played more than one thousand roles, most notably onstage in Death of a Salesman, in the 1980 film Atlantic City, and in episodes of the TV show Dallas. She was described by Inspiring Women: A Celebration of Herstory as "generally regarded as the finest actress ever developed in Canada".

Life and career
Reid was born on 4 November 1930 in London, England, the daughter of Canadian parents Walter Clarke Reid, a retired colonel of the Bengal Lancers in the Indian Army, and Helen Isabel, née Moore. While Reid was young, she and her family emigrated to Oakville, Ontario.

She attended Havergal College in Toronto and university in London, and then studied acting at a performance art school in Canada. She had a long and varied career on film, television, and stage in Canada and the United States. Her stage roles included Lady Macbeth in Macbeth, Katharina in The Taming of the Shrew, Henny in Bosoms and Neglect, and Martha in Who's Afraid of Virginia Woolf?

Reid played the scheming and domineering mother of Natalie Wood's character in 1966's This Property is Condemned, although she was only seven years Wood's senior; her other film appearances included roles in The Andromeda Strain (1971), A Delicate Balance (1973), Equus (1977), Death Ship and Atlantic City (both 1980). She also played Ray Krebbs' aunt Lil Trotter on Dallas in the early 1980s, as well as appearing in episodes of Scarecrow and Mrs. King and Columbo.

Both of Reid's marriages, to Michael Sadlier and Austin Willis, ended in divorce. She had two children with Willis. Reid died of cancer in Stratford, Ontario, aged 62, in 1993.

Filmography

Honours and awards
 Officer of the Order of Canada (1974)
 ACTRA and Dora Mavor Moore awards (1980 and 1981, respectively)
 Earle Grey Award (1988)
 Honorary degrees from York University (1970) and the University of Toronto (1989)

References

External links

1930 births
1993 deaths
Canadian film actresses
Canadian stage actresses
Canadian television actresses
Canadian expatriate actresses in the United States
Deaths from cancer in Ontario
English emigrants to Canada
Best Supporting Actress Genie and Canadian Screen Award winners
Officers of the Order of Canada
People from Stratford, Ontario
Actresses from Ontario
20th-century English actresses
Canadian Shakespearean actresses
Havergal College alumni